Fake Heiress is a podcast on BBC Radio 4 about the criminal career of Anna Sorokin, also known as Anna Delvey, a Russian-born German con artist and fraudster who posed as a wealthy heiress to access the upper echelons of New York City's social and art scenes from 2013 to 2017.

The series was created and hosted by BBC World journalist Vicky Baker and playwright Chloe Moss.

References

Crime podcasts
BBC Radio 4 programmes